East Denton is an area in the City of Newcastle upon Tyne in the English county of Tyne and Wear.

East Denton Hall, dating from 1622, was in the 18th century the seat of the prominent Montagu family. Elizabeth Montagu, the cultural critic and founder of the Blue Stockings Society, spent some time there. To the east of the Hall a waggonway led from the Caroline Pit to the coal staithes by the river Tyne in Scotswood. Bishop's House, East Denton Hall, to give it its formal name, is now the official residence of the Roman Catholic Bishop of Hexham and Newcastle.

References

Districts of Newcastle upon Tyne